Deltoplastis is a genus of moths in the family Lecithoceridae. The genus was erected by Edward Meyrick in 1925.

Species
Deltoplastis acrophanes (Meyrick, 1910)
Deltoplastis amicella (Walker, 1864)
Deltoplastis apostatis Meyrick, 1932
Deltoplastis balanitis (Meyrick, 1910)
Deltoplastis byssina (Meyrick, 1910)
Deltoplastis caduca (Meyrick, 1910)
Deltoplastis causidica (Meyrick, 1910)
Deltoplastis clerodotis (Meyrick, 1910)
Deltoplastis coercita (Meyrick, 1923)
Deltoplastis cognata C. S. Wu & Park, 1998
Deltoplastis commatopa Meyrick, 1932
Deltoplastis commodata (Meyrick, 1923)
Deltoplastis cremnaspis (Meyrick, 1905)
Deltoplastis figurata (Meyrick, 1910)
Deltoplastis figurodigita C. S. Wu & Park, 1998
Deltoplastis gypsopeda Meyrick, 1934
Deltoplastis horistis (Meyrick, 1910)
Deltoplastis lamellospina C. S. Wu & Park, 1998
Deltoplastis leptobrocha (Meyrick, 1923)
Deltoplastis lobigera Gozmány, 1978
Deltoplastis ocreata (Meyrick, 1910)
Deltoplastis ovatella Park & Heppner, 2001
Deltoplastis prionaspis Gozmány, 1978
Deltoplastis propensa (Meyrick, 1910)
Deltoplastis scopulosa Meyrick, 1910
Deltoplastis similella (Snellen, 1903)
Deltoplastis sincera (Diakonoff, 1952)
Deltoplastis straminicornis (Meyrick, 1910)
Deltoplastis tetradelta (Meyrick, 1906)

References

 
Torodorinae
Moth genera